The Chamazi Stadium (officially known as the Azam Complex Stadium) is a multi-use stadium in Mbagala, Dar es Salaam, Tanzania.  It is currently used mostly for football matches and is the home stadium of Azam FC.  The stadium holds 10,000 people.

The ground has been recognized by the African football federation and it can used to play the international matches.

External links
Chamazi Stadium, soccerway.com

Football venues in Tanzania
Buildings and structures in the Dar es Salaam Region
Azam F.C.